A mechanical tree shaker is a device that uses a hydraulic cylinder to squeeze a tree. It is used in the harvesting of some fruit trees, especially pecans. Tree shakers are also used in the Christmas tree industry to remove dead needles from cut trees.

References

Agricultural machinery